In the experimental (non-clinical) research arena, good laboratory practice or GLP is a quality system of management controls for research laboratories and organizations to ensure the uniformity, consistency, reliability, reproducibility, quality, and integrity of products in development for human or animal health (including pharmaceuticals) through non-clinical safety tests; from physio-chemical properties through acute to chronic toxicity tests.

GLP was first introduced in New Zealand and Denmark in 1972, and later in the US in 1978 in response to the Industrial BioTest Labs scandal.  It was followed a few years later by the Organization for Economic Co-operation and Development (OECD) Principles of GLP in 1992; the OECD has since helped promulgate GLP to many countries.

GLP applies to non-clinical studies conducted for the assessment of the safety or efficacy of products in development (including pharmaceuticals) for people, animals, and the environment. GLP, a data and operational quality system, is not the same as standards for laboratory safety - appropriate gloves, glasses and clothing to handle lab materials safely. The principles of GLP aim to ensure and promote safety, consistency, high quality, and reliability of chemicals in the process of non-clinical and laboratory testing. GLP is not limited to chemicals and also applies to medical devices, food additives, food packaging, colour additives, animal food additives, other non-pharmaceutical products or ingredients, biological products, and electronic products.

History
GLP was first introduced in New Zealand and Denmark in 1972. GLP was instituted in US following cases of fraud generated by toxicology labs in data submitted to the FDA by pharmaceutical companies. Industrial BioTest Labs (IBT) was the most notable case, where thousands of safety tests for chemical manufacturers were falsely claimed to have been performed or were so poor that police investigators could not piece together what work had been done...even though IBT superficially delivered the test results their contracts with the manufacturers specified.

These issues were made public in the hearings at the US Congress, which led to the FDA's publication of Proposed Regulations on GLP in 1976, with establishment of the Final Rule in June 1979 (21 CFR 58).  The Environmental Protection Agency (EPA) had also encountered similar problems in data submitted to it, and issued its own draft GLP regulations in 1979 and 1980, publishing the Final Rules in two separate parts (40 CFR 160 and 40 CFR 792) in 1983.

The OECD

Following Decision C(97),186/Final of the OECD Council, data generated in the testing of chemicals in one OECD Member Country, in accordance with OECD Test Guidelines and the Principles of GLP are accepted in all other OECD Member Countries.
OECD: ENV/MC/CHEM(98)17 part two

GLP is a quality system concerned with the organizational process and conditions under which non-clinical health and environmental safety studies are planned, performed, monitored, recorded, archived and reported.

GLP principles include
 Organization and Personnel
 Management-Responsibilities
 Sponsor-Responsibilities
 Study Director-Responsibilities
 Principal Investigator-Responsibilities
 Study Personnel-Responsibilities
 Quality assurance program
 Quality Assurance Personnel
 Facilities
 Test System Facilities
 Facilities for Test and Reference Items
 Equipment, reagents and materials
 Test systems
 Physical/Chemical
 Biological
 Test and reference items
 Standard operating procedures
 Performance of study
 Study Plan
 Conduct of Study
 Reporting of results
 Archival - Storage of Records and Reports

OECD Guidelines for the Testing of Chemicals 

OECD publishes OECD Guidelines for the Testing of Chemicals, which are guidelines that usually have to be followed for GLP compliance.  They are widely required by agencies doing risk assessments of chemicals.

The US FDA

The United States FDA has rules for GLP in 21CFR58. Preclinical trials on animals in the United States of America use these rules prior to clinical research in humans.

Research in the US not conducted under these restrictions or research done outside US not conducted according to the OECD Guidelines (or FDA rules) might be inadmissible in support of a New Drug Application in the US.

European Union

Since 1987 the European Council had adopted two basic Directives and a Decision relating to the application of the GLP principles.
Directive 2004/10/EC has replaced Directive 87/017/EEC as of 11 March 2004; Directive 2004/9/EC has replaced Directive 88/320/EEC as of 11 March 2004.

" Directive 2004/10/EC of the European Parliament and of the Council of 11 February 2004 on the harmonisation of laws, regulations and administrative provisions relating to the application of the principles of good laboratory practice and the verification of their applications for tests on chemical substances."

This directive lays down the obligation of the Member States to designate the authorities responsible for GLP inspections in their territory. It also comprises requirements for reporting and for the internal market (i.e., mutual acceptance of data).

" Directive 2004/9/EC of the European Parliament and of the Council of 11 February 2004 on the inspection and verification of good laboratory practice (GLP)".

The Directive requires that the OECD Revised Guides for Compliance Monitoring Procedures for GLP and the OECD Guidance for the Conduct of Test Facility Inspections and Study Audits must be followed during laboratory inspections and study audits.

 89/569/EEC Council Decision of 28 July 1989 on the acceptance by the European Economic Community of an OECD decision / recommendation on compliance with principles of good laboratory practice.

There are also 'Product Oriented Directives' referring to GLP obligations:

 REACH Regulation of 18 December 2006 and Directive 2006/121/EC of 18 December 2006
 Medicinal products; Directive 2001/83/EC on the Community code relating to medicinal products for human use of 6 November 2001 as amended by Commission Directive 2003/63/EC
 Veterinary Medicinal Products; Directive 2001/82/EC of the European Parliament and of the Council of 6 November 2001 on the Community code relating to veterinary medicinal products
 Cosmetics; Council Directive 93/35/EEC amending for the 6th time directive 76/768/EEC
 Feedingstuffs; Regulation (EC) No 1831/2003 of the European Parliament and of the Council of 22 September 2003 on additives for use in animal nutrition
 Foodstuffs; Directive 89/107/EEC
 Novel Foods and novel food ingredients; Regulation (EC) No 258/97 of the European Parliament and of the Council of 27 January 1997 concerning novel foods and novel food ingredients
 Pesticides; Council Directive 91/414/EEC of 15 July 1991 concerning the placing of plant protection products on the market
 Biocides; Directive 98/8/EC of the European Parliament and of the Council of 16 February 1998 concerning the placing of biocidal products on the market
 Detergents; Directive 98/8/EC Regulation (EC) No 648/2004 of the European Parliament and of the Council of 31 March 2004 on detergents
 EC Ecolabel; Commission Decision 2005/344/EC of 23 March 2005; establishing ecological criteria for the award of the Community eco-label to all-purpose cleaners and cleaners for sanitary facilities

In the meantime the EU has concluded Mutual Acceptance Agreements in the area of GLP with Israel, Japan and Switzerland. By means of the Treaty of the European Economic Area of 13 September 1993, the European Regulations and Directives also apply to Iceland, Liechtenstein and Norway.

Non-OECD member countries

An inspection in non-member economies by OECD inspectors will not guarantee that data generated in compliance with GLP will be accepted in other member countries than the one to which they are submitting data and which has thus sent inspectors to verify the accuracy of their compliance statement.

Klimisch score

The Klimisch score system tries to rank the reliability of toxicity studies for use by risk assessors (regulatory agencies).  It was published in 1997, by BASF (a chemical company) authors. Studies performed according to GLP are assigned the top rank of 1 (reliable without restriction) and are preferred by agencies.  When no GLP study is available for a particular endpoint, a study with a rank of 2 is usually accepted by an agency.  Lower ranks typically require a new study to be performed.  Klimisch scoring is very widely used in chemical risk assessments.  Critics say it is a self-interested bias on objectivity, that a quality system from the regulated party gives their own GLP-complying studies the top rank.

Automated systems 
In many instances, the optimal recommended "no-argument" means of implementing GLP is to develop an automated approach to both sample preparation and sample measurement. GLP compliance then generally entails including an overarching "chain of custody" sample history and data flow, combined with adequate standard operating procedures for calibration and linearization of measuring tools.

Notes and references

See also 
 GxP
 Good clinical practice
 Good Automated Manufacturing Practice
 Joint Committee for Traceability in Laboratory Medicine
 International Laboratory Accreditation Cooperation
 International Federation of Clinical Chemistry and Laboratory Medicine (IFCC)
 Drug development
 ISO 15189
 Verification and Validation
 Society of Quality Assurance

Further reading

External links 
  Comparison of difference versions of GLP (Comparison OECD, FDA and EPA GLP)
 Code of Federal Regulations Title 21 (Food and Drugs) Part 58 (Good Laboratory Practice for Nonclinical Laboratory Studies) (USA)
 Pharma Knowledge Park [PKP]
 Good Laboratory Practice (Organisation for Economic Co-operation and Development)
 OECD Series on Principles of Good Laboratory Practice and Compliance Monitoring
 Belgian Monitoring Authorithy for GLP
TECHNOXMART

OECD
Good practice